The Indian Journal of Rheumatology is the official journal of the Indian Rheumatology Association. It is peer reviewed and published quarterly since 2006 and was formerly published as the Journal of Indian Rheumatism Association from 1993 until 2005. The first editor-in-chief of the renamed journal was Ashok Kumar (AIIMS,).

External links

Rheumatology journals
Monthly journals
English-language journals

Medknow Publications academic journals
Publications established in 1993